Radcliffe Observatory was the astronomical observatory of the University of Oxford from 1773 until 1934, when the Radcliffe Trustees sold it and built a new observatory in Pretoria, South Africa. It is a Grade I listed building. Today, the observatory forms a part of Green Templeton College of the University of Oxford.

History

The observatory was founded and named after John Radcliffe by the Radcliffe Trustees. It was built on the suggestion of the astronomer Thomas Hornsby, who was occupying the Savilian Chair of Astronomy, following his observation of the notable transit of Venus across the sun's disc in 1769 from a room in the nearby Radcliffe Infirmary.

The observatory building commenced to designs by Henry Keene in 1772, and was completed in 1794 to the designs of James Wyatt, with a prominent octagonal  tower based on the Tower of the Winds in Athens. Its tower is topped with a statue by John Bacon of Atlas holding up the World.

Until 1839, the Savilian Chair of Astronomy was responsible for the observatory. At this date the appointment of George Henry Sacheverell Johnson an astronomer with no observational experience caused the creation of the new role of Radcliffe Observer.

Because of the viewing conditions, weather, urban development and light pollution at Oxford, the observatory  moved to South Africa in 1939. Eventually that site, in Pretoria, also became untenable and the facility was combined with others into the South African Astronomical Observatory (SAAO) in the 1970s.

The building is now used by Green Templeton College off the Woodstock Road and is  a centrepiece of  the college. The original instruments are now in the Museum of the History of Science, Oxford, except for the Radcliffe 18/24-inch Twin Refractor telescope, which was transferred to the University of London Observatory.

Radcliffe Observers
The following have been Radcliffe Observers:

 1839 Manuel John Johnson
 1860 Robert Main
 1879 Edward James Stone
 1897 Arthur Alcock Rambaut
 1924 Harold Knox-Shaw
 1950 David Thackeray

Gallery

See also

 Observatory Street to the north
 Radcliffe Observatory Quarter, a local development project
 Tower of the Winds

References

Further reading

External links
 

1772 establishments in England
Astronomical observatories in England
Astronomical observatories in South Africa
Buildings and structures of the University of Oxford
Departments of the University of Oxford
Grade I listed buildings in Oxford
Grade I listed scientific buildings
Green Templeton College, Oxford
Infrastructure completed in 1794
Towers completed in 1794
Towers in Oxford
James Wyatt buildings
Defunct astronomical observatories